Catholic Patriarch or Patriarchate of Antioch may refer to:

 Latin Patriarchate of Antioch, a Roman Catholic titular see
 Maronite Catholic Patriarchate of Antioch
 For its Patriarchs, see List of Maronite Patriarchs of Antioch
 Melkite Catholic Patriarchate of Antioch
 For its Patriarchs, see List of Melkite Catholic Patriarchs of Antioch
 Syriac Catholic Patriarchate of Antioch, a.k.a. the Syriac Catholic Church
 For its Patriarchs, see Syriac Catholic Patriarchs of Antioch

See also
Patriarch of Antioch
 Patriarchate of Antioch (disambiguation)
 Greek Orthodox Church of Antioch, List of Greek Orthodox Patriarchs of Antioch
 Syriac Orthodox Church, List of Syriac Orthodox Patriarchs of Antioch
 Latin Patriarch (disambiguation)
 Patriarchate of Jerusalem (disambiguation)
 Latin Patriarchate of Constantinople